Capnoptera is a genus of frit flies in the family Chloropidae. There are at least three described species in Capnoptera.

Species
These three species belong to the genus Capnoptera:
Capnoptera breviantennata Becker, 1910
Capnoptera pilosa Loew, 1866
Capnoptera scutata (Rossi, 1790)
Data sources: i = ITIS, c = Catalogue of Life, g = GBIF, b = Bugguide.net

References

Further reading

External links

 

Chloropidae genera
Taxa named by Hermann Loew